The University of Zielona Góra was founded on 1 September 2001 as a result of a merger between Zielona Góra's Pedagogical University, which was founded in 1971 and Technical University, which was founded in 1965. It is one of the newer universities in Poland. Main buildings are located in two campuses: "A" on Podgórna street and "B" on Wojska Polskiego street. The President's office is located near the Old Town on Licealna Street.

Faculties
The University of Zielona Góra runs 12 faculties and 1 branch faculty:

 Faculty of Arts
 Faculty of Biological Sciences
 Faculty of Civil Engineering, Architecture and Environmental Engineering
 Faculty of Computer, Electrical and Control Engineering
 Faculty of Economics and Management
 Faculty of Education, Psychology and Sociology
 Faculty of Humanities
 Faculty of Law and Administration
 Faculty of Mathematics, Computer Science and Econometrics
 Faculty of Mechanical Engineering
 Faculty of Physics and Astronomy
 Faculty of Medicine and Health Sciences
 Branch Faculty of the University of Zielona Góra in Sulechów

References

External links
 University of Zielona Góra

 
Educational institutions established in 2001
University of Zielona Gora
2001 establishments in Poland
Universities and colleges formed by merger in Poland